The Sindhi languages or Sindhic are Sindhi, its dialects and those Indo-Aryan languages closest to it. They include some varieties traditionally considered to be Gujarati:

Lasi and Sindhi Bhil are sometimes added, but are commonly considered dialects of Sindhi proper. It's not clear if Jandavra is Sindhi or Gujarati.  Though Dhatki is a Rajasthani language, it is heavily influenced by Sindhi and Kutchi.

See also
 Sindhi language
 Gujarati languages
 Punjabi dialects

Notes

References

Sindhi language